First Congregational Church of Austin, also known as Greater Holy Temple of God in Christ, is a historic church at 5701 West Midway Place in Chicago, Illinois. The church was built in 1905 for a Congregational assembly; it was later used by Seventh-Day Adventist, Roman Catholic, and Church of God in Christ congregations. A Chicago building permit was issued on August 15, 1905 according to the Chicago Tribune of August 16, 1905. Architect William Eugene Drummond, a student of Louis Sullivan and a sometime employee of Frank Lloyd Wright, designed the church in the Prairie School style; it is an unusual example of a Prairie School church and influenced Wright's Unity Temple which was designed after the original church burned on June 4, 1905.
The one-story building consists of a tall central section with massive piers and a smaller section to either side. The entrance is recessed in the base of the central section; the doorway features lintels and posts that continue the building's rectilinear emphasis. Leaded glass windows are recessed in the spaces between the central section's piers.

The church was added to the National Register of Historic Places on November 17, 1977.

References

Churches in Chicago
Prairie School architecture in Illinois
Properties of religious function on the National Register of Historic Places in Chicago
Churches completed in 1908
Churches on the National Register of Historic Places in Illinois
1905 establishments in Illinois